La Norte (also La Curva Norte or The Northside) was a soccer supporters' clubaffiliated with Major League Soccer side D.C. United from 2001-2016. The club was founded in 2001 when members of La Barra Brava left section 135 of RFK Stadium to form a new club. The club was originally situated in section 120 of RFK, as the section sat directly behind the north goal. The club takes its name from their preferred location on the north side of the stadium. La Norte were forced to change sections with the arrival of the Washington Nationals baseball franchise, and the subsequent reconfiguration of RFK's seating to accommodate a baseball diamond.

La Norte has since merged with the District Ultras and occupied sections 127 and 128 at RFK Stadium prior to the team's move to Audi Field.

References

Major League Soccer fan clubs
D.C. United
2001 establishments in Washington, D.C.